The River Orrin is a river in former Ross-shire, Highland, northern Scotland. The River Orrin is dammed in Glen Orrin making the Orrin Reservoir. It later forms the Falls of Orrin, is joined by the tributary Allt Goibhre, and then enters the River Conon near Urray shortly before it flows past Conon Bridge into the Cromarty Firth.

The river gives its name to the aircraft in the 1985 British Airtours Flight 28M accident in which 55 passengers and crew perished at Manchester Airport.

References

Orrin